Corps colours, or troop-function colours (ge: "Waffenfarbe(n)") were traditional worn in the German Wehrmacht from 1935 until 1945 as discrimination criteria between several branches, special services, corps, rank groups and appointments of the ministerial area, general staff, Oberkommando der Wehrmacht, up to the military branches Heer, Luftwaffe and Kriegsmarine. 
With the formation of the Waffen-SS (Armed Schutzstaffel) and so-called Gesamt-SA (Common Sturmabteilung) by simultaneous new-structuring in line with military principles, corps coloures were introduced to these organizations as well.

Corps colours of the SA 
After incorporation of the SA-Obergruppe Ostmark to the main SA-organisation in March 1938, the formation of Gesamt-SA began in January 1939. The new sub-division structure was as follows: 
Allgemeine SA (General SA) with Active SA-I (between 18 and 35 years) and Active SA-II (between 35 and 45 years)
SA-Reserve (above 45 years), and
SA-Wehrmannschaften (en: SA-Defence crews).

However, two former SA branches converted to other paramilitary organizations. So the previous Motor-SA was transferred to the National Socialist Motor Corps – NSMC (Nationalsozialistisches Kraftfahrerkorps – NSKK), and the Flieger-SA together with the Flieger-SS formed the new Nation Socialist Flyers Corps – NSFC (Nationalsozialistisches Fliegererkorps – NSFK).

In line with new subdivision to branches and service areas corps colours were introduced. The former so-called SA-group colours were abolished. The systematic of corps colours was introduced to NSMC and NSFC as well. The new introduced SA-corps colours were almost identically to these of the Wehrmacht.

SA-Corps colours 
The synoptic table below contains some corps colours and examples used by the SA from 1939–45.

 Remarks
Right collar patch contains the number and type of unit (ascending up to "Obersturmbannführer" (OF4) in SA and SS, and "Oberstaffelführer" (OF4) in NSMC): … Left collar patch contain the rank insignias (from ascending "Standartenführer" (OF5) both sides).

See also
 World War II German Army ranks and insignia
 Comparative military ranks of World War II
 Glossary of Nazi Germany

References

German military uniforms
Military insignia